The Newcastle Journal was a folio-sized weekly newspaper published in Newcastle-upon-Tyne from 1739 to 1788.

Establishment
William Cuthbert and the Quaker printer Isaac Thompson (1703–1776) printed a prospectus for a new Newcastle newspaper in January 1739. The enterprise, they announced, would be sustained by strict political impartiality:

Facing down mockery from the existing Newcastle Courant, the first issue of the Newcastle Journal appeared on 7 April 1739. By the summer the editors claimed they were selling "nearly 2000 of these Papers weekly". They also claimed a wide regional circulation, with agents in towns as far afield as Berwick and Newhaven, Derbyshire.

Politics
In the competition between the Journal and the Courant, each newspaper "consciously struck a balance between sales and politics". The Newcastle Journal robustly defended its right to print opposition speeches, such as the April 1740 speech against the government by John Campbell, 2nd Duke of Argyll in the House of Lords. In 1742 the newspaper included an anonymous criticism of David Hume's essay on the character of Robert Walpole, to which Hume replied in the Scots Magazine.

Later history
Thompson continued printing the Journal until the end of his life, though he also published the Newcastle General Magazine from 1746 to 1760. The printer Thomas Slack worked with Thompson at the Newcastle Journal throughout the 1750s. However, the two men fell out, and in 1764 Slack attempted his own weekly newspaper, the Newcastle Chronicle, in competition with the Newcastle Journal.

In 1773 the Newcastle Journal'' claimed circulation over an area with a 600-mile circumference. After Thompson's death in 1776, the paper was bought by T. Robson and Co, who printed it from 1778 to 1788. The paper ceased publication in April 1788.

References

Publications established in 1739
Defunct weekly newspapers
Weekly newspapers published in the United Kingdom
Mass media in Newcastle upon Tyne
History of Newcastle upon Tyne
1739 establishments in England
Publications disestablished in 1788
1788 disestablishments in England
Defunct newspapers published in the United Kingdom